Hubball is an unincorporated community in Lincoln County, in the U.S. state of West Virginia.

History
A post office called Hubball was established in 1911, and remained in operation until 1947. The community was named after one Mr. Hubball, a businessperson in the coal-mining industry.

References

Unincorporated communities in Lincoln County, West Virginia
Unincorporated communities in West Virginia